Antonetta is a feminine given name that is a variant of Antoinette and Antonia. Notable people who use this name include the following:

Susanne Antonetta, pen name of Suzanne Paola (born 1956), American poet and author 
Rosa Maria Antonetta Paulina Assing, full name of Rosa Maria Assing (née Varnhagen; 1783 – 1840), German lyric poet, prose-writer, educator, translator and silhouette artist
Margaretha Maria Antonetta Margriet de Moor (née Neefjes; born 1941), Dutch pianist and writer

See also

Antoneta Papapavli
Antonette
Antonetti
Antonietta (given name)